Coldblooded is a 1995 American black comedy/thriller film about hitmen directed by Wallace Wolodarsky and starring Jason Priestley, Peter Riegert, Robert Loggia, Kimberly Williams and Janeane Garofalo.

Plot
Cosmo Reif, an affectless mob bookie who lives in the basement of a retirement home, is promoted to hitman against his will. He learns his new trade from Steve, a seasoned killer, and proves to be a natural marksman despite having no experience with firearms. He falls in love with a yoga teacher, Jasmine, and must figure out a way to leave the mob so they can be together.

Cast

Reception
The movie received mixed reviews.

References

External links

Coldblooded at Facemelting Films

1990s black comedy films
American comedy thriller films
PolyGram Filmed Entertainment films
Films scored by Steve Bartek
Films directed by Wallace Wolodarsky
Films produced by Matt Tolmach
Films with screenplays by Wallace Wolodarsky
1995 directorial debut films
1995 comedy films
1995 films
1990s English-language films
1990s American films